Charles Paul Telford Hutchison, known as Paul Hutchison (born 1947) is a New Zealand politician and former health professional. He is a member of the National Party, which he represented in the House of Representatives from 1999 to 2014.

Early years
Hutchison was born in Wellington, and attended Khandallah School and Onslow College. He is a graduate of the University of Otago with an MB ChB in 1970, and was a consulting specialist in obstetrics and gynaecology with his medical career spanning almost 30 years. Hutchison is married with four daughters.

Member of Parliament

As an MP he has held a number of health-related roles, including opposition Spokesperson for Health, and Chairperson of the Health Committee. He was one of only two National Party MPs to support the successful Smokefree Environments Amendment Act 2003,. He voted against the Death with Dignity euthanasia bill, also in 2003.

Hutchison was spotted reading while driving by a motorist in September 2009, prompting Acting Prime Minister Bill English to warn MPs to adhere to driving regulations.

Hutchison announced in October 2013 that he was going to retire from Parliament at the 2014 general election.

References

External links
 Official website
 Paul Hutchison at the New Zealand Parliament website

|-

1947 births
People educated at Onslow College
Living people
New Zealand National Party MPs
New Zealand obstetricians
University of Otago alumni
Members of the New Zealand House of Representatives
New Zealand MPs for North Island electorates
Unsuccessful candidates in the 1996 New Zealand general election
21st-century New Zealand politicians
New Zealand gynaecologists